A nebula is a cloud of gas and dust in space.

Nebula may also refer to:

Arts, entertainment, and media

Fictional entities
Commander Nebula, a character in the animated TV series and the pilot episode film Buzz Lightyear of Star Command: The Adventure Begins and Buzz Lightyear of Star Command
Nebula (character), a Marvel Comics character
 Nebula (Marvel Cinematic Universe), the MCU version of the character
Nebula, a fictional organization in Mega Man Battle Network

Gaming
Nebula (computer game), a 1984 ZX Spectrum game
Nebula Device, an open-source realtime 3D game engine

Music
Nebula (band), an American rock band
"Nebula", a song by Incubus on the album S.C.I.E.N.C.E.

Periodicals
Nebula (magazine), a Nepali-language magazine published in India
Nebula Science Fiction, a British science fiction magazine of the 1950s

Science fiction awards
Nebula Award, a Science Fiction and Fantasy Writers of America (SFWA) award recognizing the best works of science fiction or fantasy published in the United States
Nebula Awards (China), awarded yearly for Chinese-language works of science fiction published in any country

Brands and enterprises
Nebula (company), computer company
Nebulae (computer), a supercomputer in the National Supercomputing Centre in Shenzhen, China
Nebula (computing platform), a Federal cloud computing platform
Nebula Electronics, a DigiTV DVB-T card manufacturer
Nebula (brand), a brand of projectors
Nebula (streaming service), a streaming on demand
Nebula Genomics is a personal genomics company based in San Francisco

Science and technology
Nebula (moth), a moth genus

See also
Nebulous (disambiguation)
Nebulus (disambiguation)
Planetary nebula